Hongbaoshi Road, formerly known as Gubei Road, is a metro station on the Line 15 of the Shanghai Metro. Located at the intersection of West Yan'an Road, Hongqiao Road, and Gubei Road in Changning District, Shanghai, the station is scheduled to open with the rest of Line 15 by the end of 2020. It is located just north of the intersection of Hongbaoshi Road and Gubei Road, the former of which gives the station its name.

Whether an out-of-station transfer will be allowed remains to be seen.

References 

Railway stations in Shanghai
Shanghai Metro stations in Changning District
Line 15, Shanghai Metro
Railway stations in China opened in 2021